Sardar Kamal (Urdu: سردار کمال) is a male Muslim given name. Notable people with the name include:

Sardar Kamal Khan (born 1972), Pakistani politician
Sardar Kamal Khan Bangulzai (born 1972), Pakistani politician
 Sardar Kamal is a Pakistani comedian, movie and stage actor

compound given names